Allancastria caucasica, sometimes referred to as Zerynthia caucasica, is an Old World papilionid butterfly whose geographical range extends from the Black Sea and southern Russia (southern Caucasus Mountains) to Georgia and northeast Turkey. It exhibits several geographical variants. Its natural habitat is temperate forests. It is threatened by habitat loss.

It feeds on Aristolochia species.

References

Carbonell, F., 1996. Contribution à la connaissance du genre Allancastria Bryk (1934): Morphologie, biologie et écologie d’Allancastria cretica (Rebel, 1904) (Lepidoptera: Papilionidae). Linneana Belgica 15: 303-308.

External links
TOL
Rusinsects

Papilionidae
Butterflies described in 1864
Taxa named by Julius Lederer
Taxobox binomials not recognized by IUCN